Ameer Idreis (born 1999) is a Canadian writer, who has published two books in his debut series The Ewald Series.

He has received various awards and recognition as a young novelist in Canada from the Hamilton Spectator the Canada-Arab Business Council, the Council of the Arab League, Hamilton-Wentworth District School Board and the Women's Press. He has also done work for the Canadian Broadcasting Corporation in association with the Telling Tales Festival, where he hosted interviews with the authors Kenneth Oppel and Kevin Sylvester. Ameer also participated in the Canadian Broadcasting Corporation event the Human Library. Ameer has also guest hosted on the podcast "Alohomora!"

Works

The Ewald Series
5 novels planned

Ewald and the Gems of Time
Ewald Ellington had always been a lonely 12-year-old, but after a series of outlandish events, he finds himself in another world – a world of supernatural magic, the Magic Section. He then meets a boy, Alexander Egond, whom he befriends. Through many odd occurrences, such as a moving hospital bed, a floating cafeteria table, and a flying bus, he soon finds out that he too is special. Ewald is then sent off to Tralbon school, a school where magic is abundant. Behind the scenes, an old legend is resurfacing as Gethin is preparing to strike the Magic Section once more. Gethin is in search of the Gems of Time, old heirlooms that could bring back the army that once aided him in overtaking the Magic Section's government. The three gems are scattered between different families, one of them being Ewald's. Gethin then gets hold of two of the gems, and then captures Ewald in the hope of holding him for ransom for the last Gem of Time. Luckily, Ewald is saved and the two other gems are returned.

Ewald and the Land of Unknown
Gethin is back once more, but this time the threat is greater. He has entered Tralbon school in search of the Gems of Time, which many believe are now hidden there. The school must close, and instead has the students sleep outside in tents. Ewald, Alex, and Dhiman are sent into an uncharted area called "The Land of Unknown", in order to retrieve Aleena Estrand's necklace, which holds the key to the room in which the Gems of Time are in. The trio face many challenges, including being chased by gnomes and venomous pixies, getting abducted, having to negotiate with the mystical race of Freens. The Freen Queen foresees death. Wintersplat (an old freen) believes that it is him that will die and asks to have one final adventure with the boys. During their adventure, Dhiman falls off a bridge and down to his death, completing the Freen Queen's prophecy. The remaining three (Ewald, Alex, and Wintersplat) reach Aleena's cottage and find the necklace. They teleport back to Tralbon and keep the Gems of Time from Gethin's reach for now...

Awards

The Young Achievement Award from the Council of the Arab League 2013
The Person of the Year Award from the Canada-Arab Business Council 2013

References

External links

The Official Ewald Series website

1999 births
Canadian fantasy writers
Canadian male novelists
21st-century Canadian novelists
Writers from Ontario
Living people
21st-century Canadian male writers